The Nebula Award for Best Script was given each year  by the Science Fiction and Fantasy Writers of America (SFWA) for science fiction or fantasy scripts for movies or television episodes. Awards are also given out for published literary works in the novel, novella, novelette, and short story categories. The Nebula Award for Best Script was awarded annually from 1974 through 1978, and from 2000 through 2009. It was presented under several names; in 1974, 1975, and 1977 the award was for Best Dramatic Presentation, while in 1976 the award was for Best Dramatic Writing. The award was discontinued in 2010 and replaced with The Ray Bradbury Award for Outstanding Dramatic Presentation; this award, though not a Nebula, is presented at the Nebula Awards Ceremony and follows Nebula rules and procedures. The Nebula Awards have been described as one of "the most important of the American science fiction awards" and "the science-fiction and fantasy equivalent" of the Emmy Awards.

Selection process 

Nebula Award nominees and winners are chosen by members of the SFWA, though the authors of the nominees do not need to be a member. Works are nominated each year between November 15 and February 15 by published authors who are members of the organization, and the six works that receive the most nominations then form the final ballot, with additional nominees possible in the case of ties. Members may then vote on the ballot throughout March, and the final results are presented at the Nebula Awards ceremony in May. Authors are not permitted to nominate their own works, and ties in the final vote are broken, if possible, by the number of nominations the works received. Beginning with the 2009 awards, the rules were changed to the current format. Prior to then, the eligibility period for nominations was defined as one year after the publication date of the work, which allowed the possibility for works to be nominated in the calendar year after their publication and then reach the final ballot in the calendar year after that. Works were added to a preliminary ballot for the year if they had ten or more nominations, which were then voted on to create a final ballot, to which the SFWA organizing panel was also allowed to add an additional work.

Award statistics 

During the 15 nomination years, 14 awards for Best Script have been given, including the special award given to Star Wars Episode IV: A New Hope in 1978 but not including 1977, since no nominee was given the award. No winner was declared that year as "no award" received the highest number of votes. With three awards The Lord of the Rings film trilogy earned the most awards or nominations of any franchise. The Christopher Nolan Batman movies, Battlestar Galactica, Buffy the Vampire Slayer, and Doctor Who franchises have each had two nominations, but no wins. Hayao Miyazaki, Christopher Nolan, Joss Whedon, and The Lord of the Rings screenwriters have had the most nominations, with three each.

Winners and nominees
In the following table, the years correspond to the date of the ceremony, rather than when the work was first released. Entries with a blue background and an asterisk (*) next to the writer's name have won the award; those with a white background are the other nominees on the shortlist. Entries with a gray background and a plus sign (+) mark a year when "no award" was selected as the winner.

  *   Winners and joint winners
  +   No winner selected

See also
Hugo Award for Best Dramatic Presentation

Ray Bradbury Award for Outstanding Dramatic Presentation

Notes

References

External links
 Nebula Awards official site

1974 establishments in the United States
2010 disestablishments in the United States
Awards established in 1974
Awards disestablished in 2010
Script
Science fiction awards